Page Field  is a public airport three miles (4.8 km) south of Fort Myers, in Lee County, Florida, United States. It is owned by the Lee County Port Authority; the National Plan of Integrated Airport Systems for 2011–2015 categorized it as a reliever airport.

History 

Built in 1927 as a civil airport, Page Field was taken over by the War Department at the beginning of World War II. Renamed Fort Myers Army Air Field and later, Page Field Army Airfield, it was used by the United States Army Air Forces Third Air Force for antisubmarine patrols and conventional bomber training in the B-24 Liberator. The facility returned to civil control of the State of Florida and then Lee County shortly after the end of the war.

The June 1949 chart shows 5000-ft runway 4, 4960-ft runway 9 and 5030-ft runway 13.

National Airlines started flights at Page Field in the 1930s; in April 1957 it was still the only airline, with six departures a day. In the 1950s the army barracks were replaced with a small terminal on the south side of the field, which was expanded in 1960. A new terminal was built in the mid-1970s on the north side of Page Field. 

National 727s were the first jets at FMY, in winter 1965–66; FMY's longest runway was probably still 5002 feet. Except for commuter airlines, National was alone at FMY until Eastern arrived in 1975–76. In 1981 the airport was served by Air Florida, Delta, Eastern, Florida Airlines, Northwest, Pan Am, Sun Air, TWA and United.

After deregulation of the airline industry in 1978, it became clear that Page Field was too small for future demand and on May 14, 1983, the airlines moved to the new Southwest Florida Regional Airport, now called Southwest Florida International Airport (RSW). Page Field is a designated FAA reliever airport for RSW and has only general aviation and business traffic.

Since May 14, 1983 through the end of 2019, Page Field has handled 3,483,598 aircraft operations, average 94,506 annually. In 1987, the airport experienced its busiest year ever with 120,921 aircraft operations.

Facilities

Page Field covers 670 acres (271 ha) at an elevation of 17 feet (5 m). It has two asphalt paved runways: 5/23 is 6,406 by 150 feet (1,953 x 46 m) and 13/31 is 4,912 by 150 feet (1,497 x 46 m).

In 2019, the airport handled 116,003 operations, an average 326 per day. More than 400 aircraft are based at Page Field as of January 2020. There are 21 local businesses operating at FMY, including aviation-related flight training, charter, avionics and maintenance facilities, in addition to community tenants.

In August 2011, a new terminal complex opened on the west side of Page Field. Base Operations at Page Field is a modern 22,600-square-foot building. Concierge front desk service, pilot lounges, weather briefing, flight planning and executive conference rooms, free Wi-Fi and a gift shop are offered at Base Operations. There is a 600,000-square-foot ramp with business aircraft parking, 24,000 square feet of itinerant hangar space and full-service Jet A and 100LL avgas, as well as self-serve 100LL avgas. 

In October 2019, a new Multi-Use Hangar opened with 24,000 square feet, four crew offices and an additional 58,000 square feet of paved apron space to help address the seasonal demand for aircraft ramp parking.

The economic benefit of Page Field is $385 million annually according to the 2018 Florida Department of Transportation Economic Impact Study. 2018 Economic Impact Study conducted by Florida Department of Transportation

Awards 
 Florida Department of Transportation named Page Field the General Aviation Airport of the Year in 2002 and 2008.

References

External links
 Page Field Airport (official site)
 Base Operations website
  brochure from CFASPP
 Aerial image as of January 1999 from USGS The National Map
 
 
 

Airports in Florida
Airports established in 1927
Buildings and structures in Fort Myers, Florida
Transportation in Fort Myers, Florida
1927 establishments in Florida
Transportation buildings and structures in Lee County, Florida